Dimitrios Stournaras (born 30 May 2001) is a Greek professional footballer who plays as a goalkeeper for Super League 2 club Olympiacos B.

References

2001 births
Living people
Greek footballers
Super League Greece 2 players
Gamma Ethniki players
Panionios F.C. players
Olympiacos F.C. players
Association football goalkeepers
Olympiacos F.C. B players
People from Boeotia
Footballers from Central Greece